C. albicans may refer to:
 Candida albicans, a yeast-like fungus species
 Casearia albicans, a plant species endemic to Malaysia

See also
 Albicans (disambiguation)